Port Providence is an unincorporated village along the Schuylkill River in Upper Providence Township, Montgomery County, Pennsylvania.  Originally known as Jacobs, then Lumberville, the village is located on one of the two remaining watered stretches of the Schuylkill Canal.  The village was notable as having one of the few inns on the canal between Norristown and Pottstown.  Fitzwater Station, a historic tavern, is located in Port Providence, on the canal.

Geography

Notable person
Christian C. Sanderson, historian

References

External links 
 1849 Map of Montgomery County showing "LumberVille"

Unincorporated communities in Montgomery County, Pennsylvania
Populated places on the Schuylkill River
Canals in Pennsylvania
Unincorporated communities in Pennsylvania